Dragon Ball GT: Transformation is a side-scroller beat 'em up video game developed by Webfoot Technologies and published by Atari for the Game Boy Advance in North America. The story takes place during the "Black Star Dragon Balls" and "Baby" story arcs of the anime series Dragon Ball GT.  Transformation was re-released in 2006 as part of a Game Boy Advance two-pack, which includes Dragon Ball Z: Buu's Fury on the same cartridge.

Gameplay
The gameplay is based on the standard classic "beat-'em-up" subgenre of fighting games, similar to games such as Sega's Streets of Rage series, or Konami's Teenage Mutant Ninja Turtles games.

This single player game takes place over twelve levels, each of which culminates in a boss fight.

The game sports multiple modes of play, but the story mode is the only one available from the beginning. The other gameplay modes must be unlocked by the player by purchasing them with acquired zeni, which is rewarded to the player at the end of each stage, based on their performance. The player's total points are converted into zeni, and bonuses are rewarded based on multiple factors such as time, combos, and power-ups obtained.

Reception

Dragon Ball GT: Transformation was met with average to mixed reception upon release, as GameRankings gave it a score of 68%, while Metacritic gave it 69 out of 100.

References

External links
 

2005 video games
Transformation
Game Boy Advance games
Game Boy Advance-only games
North America-exclusive video games
Video games developed in the United States
Video games scored by Yannis Brown
Webfoot Technologies games
Atari games
Toei Animation video game projects